BOSS Audio Systems is an American manufacturer of audio and video equipment for automotive, power sport and marine applications.

The company was founded by Sam Rabbani in 1987.

References

External links 
 Official website

Audio equipment manufacturers of the United States
Companies based in Oxnard, California
Consumer electronics brands
Electronics companies established in 1987
Loudspeaker manufacturers